The Binaural Tour was a concert tour by the American rock band Pearl Jam to support its sixth album, Binaural.

History

Pearl Jam promoted Binaural with tours in Europe and North America. Before the tour started on May 23, with a show in Lisbon, Portugal, two warm-up concerts were performed in Bellingham, Washington, on May 10, and Vancouver on May 11.

Pearl Jam's 2000 European tour ended in tragedy on June 30, 2000, with an accident at the Roskilde Festival in Denmark. Nine fans were crushed underfoot and suffocated to death as the crowd rushed to the front. After numerous requests for the crowd to step back, the band stopped playing and tried to calm the crowd when the musicians realized what was happening, but it was already too late. The two remaining dates of the tour were cancelled, and the band seriously considered retiring after this event. Pearl Jam was initially blamed for the accident, but the band was later cleared of responsibility. Two additional concerts through July were cancelled.

A month after the European tour concluded, the band embarked on a two-leg North American tour, starting on August 3 in Virginia Beach, Virginia. The first leg of the tour focused on the East Coast of the United States, and then the band moved to the Midwest and the West Coast for the tour's second leg. On performing after the Roskilde tragedy, vocalist Eddie Vedder said that "playing, facing crowds, being together—it enabled us to start processing it." On October 22, 2000, the band played the MGM Grand in Las Vegas, celebrating the tenth anniversary of its first live performance as a band. Vedder took the opportunity to thank the many people who had helped the band come together and make it to ten years. He noted that "I would never do this accepting a Grammy or something." The song "Alive" was purposely omitted from all shows on this tour until the final night on November 6, 2000 in Seattle at KeyArena. The band performed that night for over three hours, playing most of its hits along with covers such as "The Kids Are Alright" and "Baba O'Riley" by The Who.

The European and North American tours were documented by a long series of official bootlegs, all of which were available in record stores as well as through the band's fan club. The band released 72 live albums in 2000 and 2001, and set a record for most albums to debut in the Billboard 200 at the same time. Following the conclusion of the 2000 tour, the band released Touring Band 2000, a DVD which featured select performances from the North American legs of the tour.

Tour dates
Information taken from various sources.

Band members
Jeff Ament – bass guitar
Stone Gossard – rhythm guitar, lead guitar
Mike McCready – lead guitar
Eddie Vedder – lead vocals, guitar
Matt Cameron – drums

Songs performed

Originals

"Alive"
"Animal"
"Better Man"
"Black"
"Brain of J."
"Breakerfall"
"Breath"
"Corduroy"
"Daughter"
"Dead Man"
"Dissident"
"Do the Evolution"
"Elderly Woman Behind the Counter in a Small Town"
"Evacuation"
"Even Flow"
"Faithfull"
"Footsteps"
"Garden"
"Given to Fly"
"Go"
"Gods' Dice"
"Grievance"
"Habit"
"Hail, Hail"
"I Got Id"
"Immortality"
"In Hiding"
"In My Tree"
"Indifference"
"Insignificance"
"Jeremy"
"Last Exit"
"Leatherman"
"Light Years"
"Long Road"
"Lukin"
"Mankind"
"MFC"
"Not for You"
"Nothing as It Seems"
"Nothingman"
"Oceans"
"Of the Girl"
"Off He Goes"
"Once"
"Parting Ways"
"Pilate"
"Porch"
"Present Tense"
"Rearviewmirror"
"Red Mosquito"
"Release"
"Rival"
"Sleight of Hand"
"Smile"
"Sometimes"
"Soon Forget"
"Spin the Black Circle"
"State of Love and Trust"
"Thin Air"
"Tremor Christ"
"U"
"Untitled"
"W.M.A." (snippet)
"Wash"
"Whipping"
"Wishlist"
"Yellow Ledbetter"

Covers
"Androgynous Mind" (Sonic Youth) (snippet)
"Another Brick in the Wall" (Pink Floyd) (snippet)
"Baba O'Riley" (The Who)
"Beautiful Way" (Beck) (snippet)
"Beginning to See the Light" (The Velvet Underground) (snippet)
"Behind Blue Eyes" (The Who) (snippet)
"Bull in the Heather" (Sonic Youth) (snippet)
"Can't Help Falling in Love" (Elvis Presley)
"Crazy Mary" (Victoria Williams)
"Crown of Thorns" (Mother Love Bone)
"Don't Be Shy" (Cat Stevens)
"Everyday" (Buddy Holly)
"Fuckin' Up" (Neil Young)
"Hold On" (Tom Waits) (snippet)
"I Am a Patriot" (Steven Van Zandt)
"I Believe in Miracles" (Ramones) (snippet)
"I Got You" (Split Enz)
"In the Colosseum" (Tom Waits) (snippet)
"In the Mood" (Robert Plant) (snippet)
"Interstellar Overdrive" (Pink Floyd) (snippet)
"It's OK" (Dead Moon) (snippet)
"Jumpin' Jack Flash" (The Rolling Stones) (snippet)
"The Kids Are Alright" (The Who)
"Last Kiss" (Wayne Cochran)
"Leaving Here" (Edward Holland, Jr.)
"Little Wing" (The Jimi Hendrix Experience) (snippet)
"Love Me Two Times" (The Doors) (snippet)
"Naked Eye" (The Who)
"'O Sole Mio" (Giovanni Capurro and Eduardo di Capua) (snippet)
"On a Rope" (Rocket from the Crypt) (snippet)
"Over the Hills and Far Away" (Led Zeppelin) (snippet)
"Rockin' in the Free World" (Neil Young)
"Romanza" (anonymous) (snippet)
"Save It for Later" (The Beat) (snippet)
"Soldier of Love (Lay Down Your Arms)" (Arthur Alexander)
"Sonic Reducer" (The Dead Boys)
"Stop Your Sobbing" (The Kinks) (snippet)
"Substitute" (The Who) (snippet)
"Sympathy for the Devil" (The Rolling Stones) (snippet)
"Timeless Melody" (The La's)
"Throw Your Arms Around Me" (Hunters & Collectors)
"Trouble" (Cat Stevens)
"Without Your Love" (Roger Daltrey) (snippet)
"The Wrong Child" (R.E.M.) (snippet)

Gallery

References

2000 concert tours
Pearl Jam concert tours